Strife may refer to:

Mythology
Eris (mythology), in Greek mythology the goddess of discord, whose name means 'strife'
Bellona (goddess), Roman counterpart of Eris, and a war goddess
Enyalius, a son of Eris and god of strife
Tano Akora, god of war, thunder and strife in the Akom religion. However, he protects others from strife and death

Fiction and entertainment
Strife (play), a play by John Galsworthy, first produced in 1909
Strife (1996 video game), a 1996 video game
Strife (2015 video game), a 2015 video game
Cloud Strife, the protagonist in the Final Fantasy VII game

Music
Strife (band), an American hardcore band
"Strife" (song), by Trivium, 2013

See also
Stryfe, a Marvel Comics supervillain, particularly of the X-Men and related teams
Strafe (disambiguation)